ZOBODAT  is an online catalogue of taxonomic, bibliographic, author and  specimen data, from mainly German language sources. At August 16, 2022, it contained 3,476,485 occurrence records, 1,089 journal records (together with their contents), 25,379 authors (including their publications, and specimens collected and determined), and information on 62,977 species.

The reader may access the information in German, French, English, Spanish, Portuguese or Hungarian.

References

External links 

 

Biological databases
Taxonomy (biology)